The Schneider Opera House is a historic building in Snyder, Nebraska. It was built as a two-part commercial block building in 1900 on land formerly owned by Conrad Schneider, Snyder's founder. According to the National Register of Historic Places form, "This opera house is significant in the area of social history because it gave Snyder a neutral, nonaffiliated location for political meetings, church bazaars, community parties, high school graduation, and box socials. [...] In the days before radio, television, and sound movies, activities at the opera house were anticipated for days or weeks' ahead of time." The building has been listed on the National Register of Historic Places since September 28, 1988.

References

National Register of Historic Places in Dodge County, Nebraska
Buildings and structures completed in 1900